This is a list of electors (members of the Electoral College) who cast ballots to elect the President of the United States and Vice President of the United States in the 2004 presidential election. There are 538 electors from the 50 states and the District of Columbia. While every state except Nebraska and Maine chooses the electors by statewide vote, many states require that one elector be designated for each congressional district. Except where otherwise noted, such designations refer to the elector's residence in that district rather than election by the voters of the district.

Alabama 

– Republican – 
 Beth Chapman (born 1962) of Birmingham, at-large elector. Chapman is the Alabama State Auditor; a public relations and political consultant, she worked with several Republican campaigns in Alabama, serves as press secretary and campaign manager for Steve Windom, and was elected state auditor in 2002.
 Marty Connors of Alabaster, at-large elector. Connors is the chair of the Alabama Republican Party.
 Martha Hosey of Gulf Shore, elector for the 1st Congressional district. Hosey has been an officer in the Alabama Federation of Republican Women.
 Will Sellers of Montgomery, elector for the 2nd Congressional district. Sellers, an attorney, is a veteran of multiple Republican campaigns.
 Mike Hubbard of Auburn, elector for the 3rd Congressional district. Hubbard represents the 79th district in the Alabama House of Representatives, first elected in 1998.
 Floyd Lawson of Cullman, elector for the 4th Congressional district.
 Elbert Peters of Huntsville, elector for the 5th Congressional district.
 Bettye Fine Collins of Trussville, elector for the 6th Congressional district.
 Martha Stokes of Carrollton, Alabama, elector for the 7th Congressional district.

Alaska 

– Republican – 
 Gloria J. Tokar of Palmer, Alaska.
 Frederick H. Hahn of Anchorage, Alaska.
 Roberly R. Waldron of Anchorage, Alaska

Arizona 

– Republican
 Linda Barber
 Malcolm Barrett
 Jim Click
 Cynthia J. Collins
 Webb Crockett
 Elizabeth Wilkinson Fannin
 Ross Farnsworth
 Ira A. Fulton
 Bernice C. Roberts
 Phillip Townsend

Arkansas 

– Republican
 Bobbi Dodge, elector for the 1st congressional district.
 Gay White, elector for the 1st congressional district.
 Ida Fineburg, elector for the 1st congressional district.
 John Felts, elector for the 1st congressional district.
 Jim Davis, at-large elector.
 Martha McCaskill, at-large elector.

California 

– Democratic – 
 Robert H. Manley of Los Angeles, at-large elector.
 Barbara Schraeger of Sausalito, at-large elector.
 C. Paul Johnson of Napa, elector for the 1st Congressional district.
 Gary Simmons of Chico, elector for the 2nd Congressional district.
 Paul Batterson of Fair Oaks, elector for the 3rd Congressional district.
 Diana Madoshi of Rocklin, elector for the 4th Congressional district.
 Kyriakos Tsakopoulos of Granite Bay, elector for the 5th Congressional district.
 Donald Linker of Tiburon, elector for the 6th Congressional district.
 Paula Sandusky of Vacaville, elector for the 7th Congressional district.
 Adam Woo of San Francisco, elector for the 8th Congressional district.
 Chloe Drew of San Francisco, elector for the 9th Congressional district.
 Karl Sliferv of San Ramon, elector for the 10th Congressional district.
 Gary Prost of Livermore, elector for the 11th Congressional district.
 Joseph Cotchett of Burlingame, elector for the 12th Congressional district.
 John Smith of Fremont, elector for the 13th Congressional district.
 George Marcus of Los Altos Hills, elector for the 14th Congressional district.
 Mark Hsu of Atherton, elector for the 15th Congressional district.
 Adele Bihn of San Jose, elector for the 16th Congressional district.
 Darrell Darling of Santa Cruz, elector for the 17th Congressional district.
 Amarjit Dhaliwal of Modesto, elector for the 18th Congressional district.
 Rocco Davis of Roseville, elector for the 19th Congressional district.
 Kenneth Costa of Fresno, elector for the 20th Congressional district.
 Barbara Pyle of Fresno, elector for the 21st Congressional district.
 David Johnson of Los Angeles, elector for the 22nd Congressional district.
 Andrew M. Siegel of Santa Barbara, elector for the 23rd Congressional district.
 Michael Carpenter of Lake View Terrace, elector for the 24th Congressional district.
 Lynda Von Husen of Palmdale, elector for the 25th Congressional district.
 Randy Monroe of Running Springs, elector for the 26th Congressional district.
 Lane M. Sherman of Northridge, elector for the 27th Congressional district.
 Moreen Blum of Sherman Oaks, elector for the 28th Congressional district.
 Yolanda Dyer of Norwalk, elector for the 28th Congressional district.
 Paul I. Goldenberg of La Habra Heights, elector for the 29th Congressional district.
 Lenore Wax of Los Angeles, elector for the 30th Congressional district.
 Mitch O'Farrell of Los Angeles, elector for the 31st Congressional district.
 Franklin A. Acevedo of Los Angeles, elector for the 32nd Congressional district.
 Gwen Moore of Los Angeles, elector for the 33rd Congressional district.
 Pedro Carillo of Los Angeles, elector for the 34th Congressional district.
 Karen Walters of Inglewood, elector for the 35th Congressional district.
 Ted Lieu of Torrance, elector for the 36th Congressional district.
 Valerie McDonald of Long Beach, elector for the 37th Congressional district.
 Marvin Kropke of Pasadena, elector for the 39th Congressional district.
 Douglas E. Hitchcock of Garden Grove, elector for the 40th Congressional district.
 Barbara Kerr of Riverside, elector for the 41st Congressional district.
 Salvador Sanchez of Los Angeles, elector for the 42nd Congressional district.
 Joe Baca, Jr. of San Bernardino, elector for the 43rd Congressional district.
 Grant Gruber of Riverside, elector for the 44th Congressional district.
 James T. Ewing of Yucaipa, elector for the 45th Congressional district.
 Louise Giacoppe of Huntington Beach, elector for the 46th Congressional district.
 James G. Bohm of Irvine, elector for the 47th Congressional district.
 N. Mark Lam of Fountain Valley, elector for the 48th Congressional district.
 Chuck Lowery of Oceanside, elector for the 49th Congressional district.
 Susan Koehler of Carlsbad, elector for the 50th Congressional district.
 Mary Salas of Chula Vista, elector for the 51st Congressional district.
 Andrew Benjamin of Spring Valley, elector for the 52nd Congressional district.
 Margaret Lawrence of San Diego, elector for the 53rd Congressional district.

Colorado 

– Republican
 Theodore S. Halaby
 Robert A. Martinez
 Lilly Y. Nunez
 Cynthia H. Murphy
 Sylvia Morgan-Smith
 Diane B. Gallagher
 Vicki A. Edwards
 Frances W. Owens, wife of Governor Bill Owens
 Booker T. Graves

Connecticut 

– Democratic
 Elizabeth O'Neill
 Andrea J. Jackson-Brooks
 Donna King
 Larry Pleasant
 David J. Papandrea
 Andres Ayala, Jr.
 Joshua King

Delaware 

– Democratic
 James Johnson
 Nancy W. Cook
 Timothy G. Willard

District of Columbia 

– Democratic – 
 Linda W. Cropp
 Jack Evans
 Arrington L. Dixon

Florida 

– Republican
 Al Austin
 Allan Bense
 Sally Bradshaw
 Al Cardenas
 Jennifer Carroll
 Armando Codina
 Sharon Day
 Maria de la Milera
 Jim Dozier
 David Griffin
 Fran Hancock
 Cynthia Handley
 William Harrison
 Al Hoffman
 Bill Jordan
 Tom Lee
 Randall McElheney
 Jeanne McIntosh
 Nancy Mihm
 Gary Morse
 Marilyn Paul
 Tom Petway
 Sergio Pino
 John Thrasher
 Janet Westling
 Robert Woody
 Zach Zachariah

Georgia 

– Republican – 
 Anna R. Cablik
 Fred Cooper
 Nancy N. Coverdell
 James C. Edenfield
 Karen Handel
 Donald F. Layfield
 Carolyn Dodgen Meadows
 Sunny K. Park
 Alec Poitevint
 Joan Ransom
 Nardender G. Reddy
 Jame Raynolds
 Norma Mountain Rogers
 Eric Tanenblatt
 Virgil Williams

Hawaii 

– Democratic
 Frances Kagawa
 Joy Kobashigawa Lewis
 Samuel Mitchell
 Dolly Strazar

Idaho 

– Republican
 Pete T. Cenarrusa
 Debbie Field
 Sandra Patano
 John A. Sandy

Illinois 

– Democratic
 Constance A. Howard
 Carrie Austin
 Shirley R. Madigan
 Tony Muñoz
 James DeLeo
 Joan Brennan
 Vera Davis
 Linda Pasternak
 William A. Marovitz
 Daniel M. Pierce
 Debbie Halvorson
 Molly McKenzie
 Beth Ann May
 Mary Lou Kearns
 Lynn Foster
 John Nelson
 Mary Boland
 Shirley McCombs
 Jerry Sinclair
 Barbara Flynn Currie
 John R. Daley

Indiana 

– Republican
 Kenneth Culp
 John Zentz
 Michael Miner
 Saundra Huddleston
 Leeann Cook
 Ted Ogle
 Melissa Proffitt Reese
 Dudley Curea
 Larry Shickles
 James Kittle
 Jean Ann Harcourt

Iowa 

– Republican
 Julie Hosch
 Velma Huebner
 Don Racheter
 Marilyn Bose
 Don Kass
 Dorothy Schlitter
 Wanda Sears

Kansas 

– Republican – 
 Ruth Garvey Fink of Topeka.
 Bernard "Bud" Hentzen of Wichita.
 Dennis Jones of Lakin.
 Wanda Konold of Pratt.
 Jack Ranson of Wichita.
 Patricia Pitney Smith of Overland Park.

Kentucky 

– Republican
 Rachel N. McCubbin, elector for the 1st Congressional district.
 Keith A. Hall, elector for the 2nd Congressional district.
 Carolyn Cole, elector for the 3rd Congressional district.
 Martha G. Prewitt, elector for the 4th Congressional district.
 Donald E. Girdler, elector for the 5th Congressional district.
 Constance M. Gray, elector for the 6th Congressional district.
 Frank Schwendeman, at-large elector.
 Carla T. Bartleman, at-large elector.

Louisiana 

– Republican
 Winston Thomas "Tom" Angers
 Michael Bayham
 David R. Carroll
 Archie Corder
 Floyd Gonzalez
 E. Gerald Hebert
 John H. Musser, IV
 Salvador "Sal" Palmisano, III
 Ruth L. Ulrich

Maine 

– Democratic
 Lu Bauer, elector for the 1st Congressional district.
 David Garrity, elector for the 2nd Congressional district.
 Jill Duson, at-large elector.
 Samuel Shapiro, at-large elector.

Maryland 

– Democratic – 
 Norman Conway
 Delores G. Kelley
 Lainey Lebow Sachs
 Pam Jackson
 Dorothy Chaney
 John Riley
 Wendy Fielder
 Daphne Bloomberg
 Tom Perez
 Gary Gensler

Massachusetts 

– Democratic
 Cathaleen L. Ashton
 Sharon M. Pollard
 Elizabeth Moroney
 Helen Covington
 Candice E. Lopes
 Susan Thomson
 Robert P. Cassidy
 William P. Dooling
 William Eddy
 Thomas V. Barbera
 Mushtaque A. Mirza
 Calvin T. Brown

Michigan 

– Democratic
 Carol Vining Moore
 Margaret Robinson
 Ida I. DeHaas
 Marcela L. Ort
 Vickie Sue Price
 Paul Todd
 Leonard Smigielski
 Bruce McAttee
 Stanley W. Harris
 Yvonne Williams
 Elizabeth D. Tavarozzi
 Charley Jackson, Jr.
 Joan Robinson Cheeks
 Roger Short
 Harless Scott
 Richard Shoemaker
 Michael Pitt

Minnesota 

– Democratic-Farmer-Labor
 Sonja Berg of St. Cloud
 Vi Grooms-Alban of Cohasset
 Matthew Little of Maplewood
 Michael Meuers of Bemidji
 Tim O'Brien of Edina
 Lil Ortendahl of Osakis
 Everett Pettiford of Minneapolis
 Jean Schiebel of Brooklyn Center
 Frank Simon of Chaska
 Chandler Harrison “Harry” Stevens of Austin

One elector voted for John Edwards (whose name they erroneously spelled as ) for both President and vice-president.

Mississippi 

– Republican – 
 Kelly Segars of Iuka
 John Phillips of Yazoo City
 Wayne Parker of Madison
 Jimmy Creekmore of Jackson
 Victor Mavar of Biloxi
 Billy Mounger of Jackson

Missouri 

– Republican – 
 Rosemary Kochner – 1st Congressional District
 Fred Dyer – 2nd Congressional District
 Miriam Stonebraker – 3rd Congressional District
 Carolyn McDowell – 4th Congressional District
 Cathy Owens – 5th Congressional District
 Steve Krueger – 6th Congressional District
 Emory Melton – 7th Congressional District
 John Schudy – 8th Congressional District
 Richard Hardy – 9th Congressional District
 John Marshalk – State at-large
 Warren Erdman – State at-large

Montana 

– Republican – 
 Jack Galt of Martinsdale
 Thelma Baker of Missoula
 John Brenden of Scobey

Nebraska 

– Republican – 
 Curt Bromm – 1st Congressional District
 Michael John Hogan – 2nd Congressional District
 Bill Barrett – 3rd Congressional District
 Kay Orr – State at-large
 Ken Stinson – State at-large

Nevada 

– Republican – 
 Joe Brown of Las Vegas
 Milton Schwartz of Las Vegas
 John Marvel of Battle Mountain
 Beverly Willard of Carson City
 Paul Willis of Pahrump

New Hampshire 

– Democratic – 
 Jeanne Shaheen of Madbury
 Peter Burling of Cornish
 Judy Reardon of Manchester
 James Ryan of Henniker

New Jersey 

– Democratic – 
 Warren Wallace
 Wilfredo Caraballo – State Assemblyman and former New Jersey Public Advocate
 Tom Canzanella
 Carolyn Walch
 Peggy Anastos
 Bernard Kenny – Majority Leader of the State Senate
 Ronald Rice – State Senator and Deputy Mayor of Newark
 Abed Awad
 Jack McGreevey – Father of former Gov. James McGreevey
 Wendy Benchley
 Loni Kaplan
 Carolyn Wade
 Riletta L. Cream
 Bernadette McPherson – Bergen County Freeholder
 Upendra Chivukula – State Assemblyman

New Mexico 

– Republican – 
 Rod Adair
 Ruth D. Kelly
 Rick Lopez
 Lou Melvin
 Rodney Montoya

New York 

– Democratic
 Joseph Ashton
 Bill de Blasio – New York City Councilman
 Molly Clifford
 Lorraine Cortes-Vazquez
 Inez Dickens – Vice Chair, New York State Democratic Committee
 Danny Donahue
 Herman D. Farrell – New York State Assemblyman; chair, New York State Democratic Committee
 C. Virginia Fields – Manhattan Borough President
 Emily Giske
 Bea Gonzalez
 Alan Hevesi – New York State Comptroller
 Frank Hoare
 Felix Ortiz- New York State Assemblyman for 51st District of New York
 Virginia Kee
 Peggy Kerry
 Denise King
 Len Lenihan – Chairman of the Erie County Democratic Party
 Bertha Lewis – Co-chair, Working Families Party
 Alan Lubin
 Thomas J. Manton – chair, Queens County Democratic Committee; Former Congressman
 Dennis Mehiel – 2002 Democratic Nominee for Lieutenant Governor of New York
 June O'Neill
 David Paterson – Minority Leader, New York State Senate
 Jose Rivera – New York State Assemblyman; chair, Bronx County Democratic Committee
 Rich Schaffer
 Chung Seto
 Sheldon Silver – Speaker, New York State Assembly
 Eliot Spitzer – Attorney General of New York
 Antoine Thompson – Buffalo City Councilman
 Paul Tokasz – Majority Leader, New York State Assembly
 Bill Wood
 Robert Zimmerman

North Carolina 

– Republican
 Joseph W. Powell, Jr.
 Ann Sullivan
 William B. Carraway
 Sandra Carter
 William H. Trotter
 Thomas D. Luckadoo
 Judy Keener
 Marcia M. Spiegel
 Dewitt Rhoades
 Davey G. Williamson
 Theresa Esposito
 Elizabeth Kelly
 Larry W. Potts
 Joe Morgan
 Robert Rector

North Dakota 

– Republican – 
 Betsy Dalrymple of Casselton
 Ben Clayburgh of Grand Forks
 Jackie Williams of Williston

Ohio 

– Republican
 Spencer R. Raleigh
 Joyce M. Houck
 Betty Jo Sherman
 Gary C. Suhadolnik
 Randy Law
 Leslie J. Spaeth of Mason.  Former Warren County auditor and chairman of the Warren County Republican Party.
 David Whipple Johnson
 Robert S. Frost
 Alex R. Arshinkoff
 Phil A. Bowman
 Jon Allison
 Katharina Hooper
 Pernel Jones, Sr.
 Henry M. Butch O'Neill
 William O. Dewitt, Jr.
 Karyle Mumper
 Owen V. Hall
 Merom Brachman
 J. Kirk Schuring
 Billie Jean Fiore

Oklahoma 

– Republican
 George W. Wiland, III
 Paul R. Hollrah
 M. Colby Schwartz
 Diana Gunther
 Ken Bartlett
 Donald G. Burdick
 Bob Hudspeth

Oregon 

– Democratic
 Michael J. Bohan
 Shirley A. Cairns
 James L. Edmunson
 Moshe D. Lenske
 Meredith Wood Smith
 Judy A. Sugnet
 Paul F. Zastrow

Pennsylvania 

– Democratic
 Lynne Abraham – District Attorney of Philadelphia
 Richard W. Bloomingdale
 Blondell Reynolds Brown – Philadelphia city councilwoman
 Robert P. Casey Jr. – Pennsylvania Auditor General
 Eileen Connelly
 H. William DeWeese – Minority Leader of the Pennsylvania House of Representatives
 John Dougherty – Union Leader
 Richard E. Filippi – Mayor of Erie
 William M. George
 Renee Gillinger – activist
 Jennifer L. Mann – state representative
 Robert J. Mellow – Minority Leader of the Pennsylvania Senate
 Dan Onorato – Allegheny County Executive
 Juan Ramos – Philadelphia city councilman
 Stephen R. Reed – Mayor of Harrisburg
 T. J. Rooney  – state representative, Democratic Party chairman
 Jonathan Saidel – Philadelphia City Controller
 John F. Street – Mayor of Philadelphia
 Rosemary Trump
 Sala Udin     – former Pittsburgh city councilman
 Constance H. Williams – state senator

Rhode Island 

– Democratic
 M. Teresa Paiva-Weed
 Elizabeth Dennigan
 John C. Lynch
 Mark Weiner

South Carolina 

– Republican
 Katon E. Dawson
 Buddy Witherspoon
 Wayland Moody
 Thomas H. McLean
 Brenda Bedenbaugh
 Edwin G. Foulke, Jr.
 Robert A. Reagan
 Drew McKissick

South Dakota 

– Republican  – 
 Dennis Daugaard – Lieutenant Governor of South Dakota
 Larry Long – Attorney General of South Dakota
 Mike Rounds – Governor of South Dakota

Tennessee 

– Republican
 Susan Anderson- Republican activist (7th District elector)
 Betty Cannon – Tennessee Federation of Republican Women & Republican state executive committeewoman (5th District Elector)
 Winfield Dunn – former governor of Tennessee 1971–1975 (at-large elector)
 Geneva Williams Harrison – Blount County commissioner (2nd District elector)
 Brock Hill – Mayor of Cumberland County (4th District elector)
 Bruce Montgomery – Sheriff of Sevier County (1st District elector)
 Claude Ramsey – Mayor of Hamilton County (3rd District elector)
 Bob Rial – Dickson City councilman and Republican state executive committeeman (8th District elector)
 John Ryder – Republican national committeeman (9th District elector)
 Mark Tipps – Attorney and former chief of staff to Sen. Bill Frist (at-large elector)
 Sally Wall – Republican activist (6th District elector)

Texas 

– Republican – 

 Royce Hayes of Flint, TX was an elector for Texas's 1st congressional district.
 Tom Cotter of Baytown, TX was an elector for Texas's 2nd congressional district and was elected Secretary of the 2004 Texas Electoral College.
 Jay Pierce of Garland, TX was an elector for Texas's 3rd congressional district.
 Marjorie Chandler of Texarkana, TX was an elector for Texas's 4th congressional district.
 Lance Lenz of Van, TX was an elector for Texas's 5th congressional district.
 Barbara Grusendorf of Arlington, TX was an elector for Texas's 6th congressional district.
 Bill Borden of Bellaire, TX was an elector for Texas's 7th congressional district.
 Jim Wiggins of Conroe, TX was an elector for Texas's 8th congressional district.
 Anna Rice of Houston, TX was an elector for Texas's 9th congressional district.
 Jan Galbraith of Austin, TX was an elector for Texas's 10th congressional district.
 Sue Brannon of Midland, TX was an elector for Texas's 11th congressional district.
 Cheryl Surber of Fort Worth, TX was an elector for Texas's 12th congressional district.
 Mike Ussery of Amarillo, TX was an elector for Texas's 13th congressional district.
 Sid Young of Texas City, TX was an elector for Texas's 14th congressional district.
 Frank Morris of Harlingen, TX was an elector for Texas's 15th congressional district.
 Roger O'Dell of El Paso, TX was an elector for Texas's 16th congressional district.
 Christopher DeCluitt of Waco, TX was an elector for Texas's 17th congressional district.
 Martha Greenlaw of Houston, TX was an elector for Texas's 18th congressional district.
 Marcus Anderson of Abilene, TX was an elector for Texas's 19th congressional district.
 Mike Provost of San Antonio, TX was an elector for Texas's 20th congressional district.
 Bennie Bock of New Braunfels, TX was an elector for Texas's 21st congressional district.
 Kathy Haigler of Deer Park, TX was an elector for Texas's 22nd congressional district.
 Kim Hesley of Pipe Creek, TX was an elector for Texas's 23rd congressional district.
 Peter Wrench of Irving, TX was an elector for Texas's 24th congressional district.
 Morris Woods of Austin, TX was an elector for Texas's 25th congressional district.
 Rhealyn Samuelson of Denton, TX was an elector for Texas's 26th congressional district.
 Nancy Stevens of Corpus Christi, TX was an elector for Texas's 27th congressional district.
 Loyce McCarter of Lavernia, TX was an elector for Texas's 28th congressional district.
 Larry Bowles of Houston, TX was an elector for Texas's 29th congressional district.
 Dan Mosher of Dallas, TX was an elector for Texas's 30th congressional district.
 Glenn Warren of Austin, TX was an elector for Texas's 31st congressional district.
 Kristina Kiik of Richardson, TX was an elector for Texas's 32nd congressional district.
 Susan Weddington of San Antonio, TX was an elector at large, and was elected Chairman of the 2004 Texas Electoral College.
 Charles Burchett of Kirbyville, TX was an elector at large.

Utah 

– Republican
 Olene S. Walker – Governor of Utah
 Gayle McKeachnie – Lieutenant Governor of Utah
 Lewis K. Billings – Mayor of Provo
 Joseph A. Cannon – Chairman of the Utah Republican Party
 Scott F. Simpson – Executive Director of the Utah Republican Party

Vermont 

– Democratic – 
 Billi Gosh of Brookfield.
 Paul Highberg of Woodstock.
 Jeffry Taylor of Clarendon.

Virginia 

– Republican
 Yvonne McGee McCoy
 Loretta H. Tate
 Theodore C. Brown, Jr.
 F. Woodrow Harris
 Keith C. Drake
 Wendell S. Walker
 Peter E. Broadbent, Jr.
 Sean Michael Spicer
 Lloyd C. Martin
 Dorothy L. Simpson
 Carlton John Davis
 Charles E. Dane
 Rebecca Anne Stoeckel

Washington 

– Democratic
 David W. Peterson
 Mary F. Ervin
 Valeria Ogden
 Patsy Whitefoot
 Larry Armstrong
 Ken Bumgarner
 Richard Kelley
 Sarah Chandler
 Greg Markley
 Alan Johanson
 Mary Z. Crosby

West Virginia 

– Republican
 Rob Capehart
 Doug McKinney
 Dan Moore
 Richie Robb
 Larry Faircloth

Wisconsin 

– Democratic
 Gail Gabrelian
 Margaret McEntire
 Jordan Franklin
 Martha Toran
 Jim Shinners
 Jan Banicki
 Daniel Hannula
 Steve Mellenthin
 Glenn Carlson
 Linda Honold

Wyoming 

– Republican – 
 Linda Barker of Cheyenne.
 Jack Van Mark of Torrington.
 Mike Baker of Thermopolis.

References

External links 
 List of Presidential Electors for 2004 from NARA

United States presidential electors, 2004
2004
George W. Bush-related lists